Setkyathiha Pagoda is a notable pagoda in Mandalay, Burma. It is known for a large bronze image of the Buddha cast by King Bagyidaw in Inwa just before the beginning of the First Anglo-Burmese War in 1824. The image was subsequently moved to Amarapura in 1852 when the Second Anglo-Burmese War broke out, and to Mandalay in 1885 when the Third Anglo-Burmese War broke out. The pagoda was built in 1884, located south of Zegyo Market on the eastern bank of the Shwetachaung Canal.

Notes

References

Pagodas in Myanmar
Buddhist temples in Mandalay
Religious buildings and structures completed in 1167